Staroźreby  is a village in Płock County, Masovian Voivodeship, in east-central Poland. It is the seat of the gmina (administrative district) called Gmina Staroźreby.

References

Villages in Płock County
Płock Governorate
Warsaw Voivodeship (1919–1939)